Dr. Ariel Rosita King (Dr. Ariel R. King) is the founder of the Ariel Foundation International Women Impacting Public Policy (WIPP) and organizes AFI-Changemaker events which have been held at the United Nations. King has a consultancy firm, Ariel Consulting International.

Early life
King obtained an MPH in International Health from the University of Texas School of Public Health in 1994, and an MBA in International Health Management from Thunderbird, the American Graduate School of International Management in 1996. She completed her PhD in Public Health and Policy from the London School of Hygiene and Tropical Medicine in 2002.

Career 
Dr. Ariel Rosita King is known for her international health policy work, particularly with regard to HIV/AIDS, King is a founding and board member of Women Impacting Public Policy (WIPP). She is a Rotarian, and is the Washington, DC representative for the National Council of Women at the UN United Nations. She is vice-chair of the Continental Advisory Board and the Chair of the Resource Mobilisation Committee, of Social Aspects of HIV/AIDS Reliance Alliance (S.A.H.A.R.A). She has served on the Boards of Directors of the National Black Women's Health Project, Positive Art: Women and Children with HIV/AIDS in South Africa, The Life Foundation AIDS Foundation of Hawaii, The Black Alliance for AIDS Prevention, and the Ronald McDonald House. King is also a member of the board of trustees of the Acid Survivors Trust International. In 2010, she also met with Princess Anne (Anne, Princess Royal) in the United Kingdom to discuss her non-profit work.

King has given presentations internationally on various research topics and has publications on the topics of HIV/AIDS, international health policy, national drug policy, medical ethics, health legislation, organ transplantation, and breast cancer.   She has led the Ariel Foundation in the creation and hosting of cutting-edge programs for young person development, such as AFI Changemakers-UN, and AFI Youth Summit, at the UN in Geneva.   Under her leadership, AFI has earned ECOSOC status at the United Nations.,

King advocates for the rights of children, through the Ariana-Leilani International Children's Foundation.

Personal life 
King, born in 1962, lives in Europe, and is the mother of Ariana-Leilani King-Pfeiffer (aka Ariana-Leilani King), in regard to whom she has raised constitutional and international children's and parents rights issues.

References

External links 
Ariel Consulting International
Ariel Foundation International
Social Aspects of HIV/AIDS Reliance Alliance (S.A.H.A.R.A)
Regulating How We Die: The Ethical, Medical and Legal Issues Surrounding Physician-Assisted Suicide, British Medical Journal 1998
Ariana-Leilani International Childrens Foundation
 Ariana-Leilani Website
 Ariana-Leilani Website
 AFI Changemakers Website

American health activists
Year of birth missing (living people)
Living people
University of Texas Health Science Center at Houston alumni